Arttu Ilomäki (born 12 June 1991) is a Finnish professional ice hockey forward who currently plays for HC TPS of Liiga.

Playing career
Ilomäki began his youth and professional Liiga career with Tappara, although he has spent periods on loan with teams such as LeKi of Mestis. He has also played for KalPa and Lukko of Liiga.

Following the 2018–19 season, playing 9 years in the Liiga, Ilomäki left as a free agent to sign his first contract abroad, agreeing to a two-year contract with Swedish club, Luleå HF of the SHL on April 24, 2019.

Career statistics

Regular season and playoffs

International

References

External links

1991 births
Living people
Finnish ice hockey forwards
HV71 players
KalPa players
Lempäälän Kisa players
Lukko players
Luleå HF players
Tappara players
Ice hockey people from Tampere
HC TPS players